Ralph Hosack (born 1935) is a Canadian boxer. He competed in the men's middleweight event at the 1956 Summer Olympics.

References

1935 births
Living people
Canadian male boxers
Olympic boxers of Canada
Boxers at the 1956 Summer Olympics
Place of birth missing (living people)
Middleweight boxers